is a fantasy comedy drama Japanese film directed by Toshiro Goto and released in 2006 by VAP. It is part of the Akihabara Trilogy of films revolving around the Akihabara cosplay and otaku subcultures. It was distributed in the United States by Asia Pulp Cinema.

Plot
Ryōta, a collector of model figures, receives a box with doll parts from a mysterious shop in Akihabara. After assembling and customizing them, the figurine magically turns into real, android-like, woman named Airu. After learning how to speak more naturally, Airu finds a picture of Ryōta's ex-girlfriend Yuria and tries to understand what happened in their past.

Cast
 Hideo Tsubota, as Ryōta
 Yuria Hidaka, as Airu
 Noriko Kijima, as Yuria

External links
 Official website (archived)

References

2006 films
2000s Japanese-language films
Films set in Tokyo
Cosplay
Akihabara
2000s Japanese films
Otaku in fiction